Phyllonorycter aeriferella is a moth of the family Gracillariidae. It is known from Canada (Ontario and Québec) and the United States (Florida, Ohio, Pennsylvania, Maine, New York, Connecticut, Kentucky and Illinois).

The wingspan is 7-8.5 mm.

The larvae feed on Quercus species, including Quercus alba, Quercus bicolor, Quercus falcata, Quercus ilicifolia, Quercus imbricaria, Quercus macrocarpa, Quercus muehlenbergii, Quercus nigra, Quercus prinus, Quercus tinctoria and Quercus velutina. They mine the leaves of their host plant. The mine has the form of a small tentiform mine on the underside of the leaf. The leaf is thrown into a fold before pupation and the cuticles are folded and corrugated. The pupa is contained in an oval cocoon, within the mine, made of frass and silk.

References

External links
Phyllonorycter at microleps.org
mothphotographersgroup
MONC-Moths of North Carolina

aeriferella
Moths of North America

Moths described in 1859
Leaf miners
Lepidoptera of Canada
Lepidoptera of the United States
Taxa named by James Brackenridge Clemens